Maddox Street is a street in the Mayfair area of London, extending from Regent Street to St George's, Hanover Square.

History
Maddox Street was completed in 1720. It was named after Sir Benjamin Maddox who owned the Millfield estate on which the street was built. The Mason's Arms, located at 38 Maddox Street, was built in 1721 and rebuilt in its current form in 1934.

Dickenson's Drawing Gallery, whose teachers included John Mogford and whose students included Emily Mary Osborn, was established at 18 Maddox Street in the early 19th century: the premises are now known as ArtSpace Galleries. Nearby, Maddox Gallery is based at 9 Maddox Street, one of several art galleries on this road. A Museum of Building Appliances, established in the street in 1866, no longer exists. 

Famous residents have included Samuel Whitbread, the Member of Parliament and brewer, who lived at 33 Maddox Street in the late 19th century, Harry Wooldridge, the English musical antiquary, who lived with Robert Bridges, the Poet Laureate, at 50 Maddox Street in the 1890s and Edward Gathorne-Hardy, the British Bohemian socialite, who lived at 39 Maddox Street in the 1930s.

Alligator Rainwear, a subsidiary of the London Waterproof Company founded by Reuben Satinoff after the First World War, had its trading office on Maddox Street.

Wilkinson & Son, tailors and robemakers to the King, were based at 34 Maddox Street in the 1920s.

The Rolling Stones operated from offices at 46A Maddox Street and Chappell Recording Studios, where the Beatles  held recording sessions in the 1960s, was also located at 52 Maddox Street.

Hibiscus, a London restaurant owned and run by French chef Claude Bosi, was located at 29 Maddox Street until it closed in 2016. Meanwhile, the imposing building known as 47 Maddox Street, which was designed by Walter Williams for Messrs Lawrence – a firm of tailors which was later known as Walter Williams – was completed in 1892 and is now occupied by Brown's Restaurant.

The fictitious female occult detective and palmist Miss Diana Marburg, created by L.T. Meade and Robert Eustace in 1902, lived in Maddox Street and was indeed known as "The Oracle of Maddox Street".

References

Mayfair
Streets in the City of Westminster